Uncomfortable Oxford is a social enterprise and tour guide organisation operating in the city of Oxford, England. Founded in 2018 by Oxford University DPhil history students, the goal of the tours was to highlight the history of imperialism, gender and class inequalities within the city. The organisation also creates podcasts, blog articles, runs workshops and outreach programs, and hosts public lectures. In 2019 Uncomfortable Oxford received a High Commendation from the Vice Chancellor's Social Impact Awards for "exceptional achievement and commitment to positive social change", for which it was awarded with funding from the AHRC-TORCH which was awarded by The Oxford Centre for the Research in the Humanities.

In 2022 a new branch was founded in Cambridge called Uncomfortable Cambridge.

Activity

Oxford city tours 
Uncomfortable Oxford holds various tours in addition to seasonal and specialist events, though the themes and routes change regularly. These tours include;

 The Uncomfortable Oxford Tour - An introductory tour to the city highlighting the historical legacies of inequality, violence, and imperialism, including war memorials, statues, and discussions on the politics of memorialisation. 
 The Oxford and Empire Tour - A tour focusing specifically on the links between imperialism and Oxford University and how the university helped facilitate the expansion of the British Empire.
 Follow the Money - A tour designed to highlight the ethical debates concerning the sources of funding of Oxford's academic institutions.
 Uncomfortable Literature - A tour focusing on Oxford's publishing and literature history as well as highlighting authors who were overlooked due to their gender, race or nationality.
 Uncomfortable Ashmolean Tour - A tour which takes place within Oxford University's Ashmolean Museum, which question the narratives of museum displays.

Due to the 2020 COVID-19 pandemic Uncomfortable Oxford began hosting online tours within video meetings using 360 camera angles of Oxford landmarks to illustrate their subjects.

Collaborations with Oxford institutions 
Uncomfortable Oxford has conducted numerous collaborations with a large number of Oxford institutions including; the Ashmolean Museum, Pitt Rivers Museum, Project SOUP, Branch Up [Oxford Hub], Wadham College, the Oxford Climate Justice Campaign, Experience Oxfordshire, the Bodleian Library, the Department of Geography, and the Welcome Centre for Ethics and Humanities.

In late 2020 Uncomfortable Oxford started to conduct collaborations with the Museum of Modern Art, Oxford to highlight the work of female anthropologists who had worked within Oxford.

Uncomfortable Cambridge 
In April 2022 a new branch of Uncomfortable Oxford was founded in the English city of Cambridge under the name Uncomfortable Cambridge, and was launched alongside Cambridge Festival. The first batch of tours were free entry, with guests being encouraged to instead donate to a homeless charity called Jimmy's Cambridge.

References

External links
 

2018 establishments in England
Tourism in Oxford
Tour guides
Companies based in Oxford